Am I OK? is a 2022 American comedy-drama film directed by Tig Notaro and Stephanie Allynne and written by Lauren Pomerantz. It stars Dakota Johnson, Sonoya Mizuno, Jermaine Fowler, Kiersey Clemons, Molly Gordon, June Diane Raphael, Tig Notaro, and Sean Hayes.

It had its world premiere at the 2022 Sundance Film Festival on January 24, 2022, and is set to premiere on HBO Max on a yet-to-be-determined date.

Premise
Lucy, a 32-year-old woman living in Los Angeles, realizes that all her dates with men are unsuccessful because she is a lesbian. With the help of her lifelong best friend Jane, she attempts to navigate coming out and dating women in her 30s.

Cast
 Dakota Johnson as Lucy
 Sonoya Mizuno as Jane
 Jermaine Fowler as Danny
 Kiersey Clemons as Brittany
 Whitmer Thomas as Ben
 Molly Gordon as Kat
 June Diane Raphael
 Tig Notaro as Sheila
 Sean Hayes as Stu
 Odessa A'zion as Sky

Production
In October 2019, it was announced Tig Notaro and Stephanie Allynne would direct the film from a screenplay by Lauren Pomerantz, with Jessica Elbaum and Will Ferrell set to produce under their Gloria Sanchez Productions banner. In January 2021, Dakota Johnson, Sonoya Mizuno, Jermaine Fowler, Whitmer Thomas, Molly Gordon, June Diane Raphael, Notaro and Sean Hayes joined the cast of the film, with Johnson also serving as a producer under her TeaTime Pictures banner.

Principal photography began in February 2021 in Los Angeles. Shortly after production began, it was halted for a week after a crew member tested positive for COVID-19 in the midst of the ongoing pandemic.

Release
The film had its world premiere at the Sundance Film Festival on January 24, 2022. Shortly after, HBO Max and Warner Bros. Pictures acquired distribution rights to the film. It is set to premiere on HBO Max on a yet-to-be-determined date.

Reception

References

External links
 

2022 comedy-drama films
2022 independent films
2022 LGBT-related films
2020s American films
2020s buddy comedy-drama films
2020s English-language films
2020s female buddy films
American buddy comedy-drama films
American female buddy films
American independent films
American LGBT-related films
Film productions suspended due to the COVID-19 pandemic
Films produced by Will Ferrell
Films set in Los Angeles
Films shot in Los Angeles
Gloria Sanchez Productions films
HBO Max films
Lesbian-related films
LGBT-related buddy comedy-drama films
Warner Bros. films
Works by Tig Notaro